"Been There, Done That" is the second single by West Coast rapper and producer Dr. Dre from the compilation album Dr. Dre Presents the Aftermath.

Background and reception
The song was produced by Dre himself and features co-production from Bud'da. The lyrics were written by former Death Row Records labelmate, J-Flexx. After Dre's departure from the label, J-Flexx released a diss song on the Death Row Greatest Hits compilation titled "Who Been There, Who Done That". The song was referenced at the end of "Guilty Conscience" by Eminem, which was a collaboration with Dre. background vocalist Dorothy Coleman and Barbara Wilson. 

Mosi Reeves from Rolling Stone said: “ Fans respected Dre’s call to renounce violence and focus on making money, but “Been There, Done That” didn’t quite resonate with them like his earlier work.“ and added: “Been There, Done That” is an early example of what would later be called “grown-man rap,” and as rap stars age and try to reconcile their maturity with their hellion public images, it deserves a special place in the Dre canon.“

Track listing
 CD single
 "Been There, Done That" (Radio Edit) - 4:06
 "Been There, Done That" (Video Mix) - 5:14
 "Been There, Done That" (Video Mix Instrumental) - 5:14

 12" vinyl
 "Been There, Done That" (LP Version) - 5:14
 "Been There, Done That" (Radio Edit) - 4:06
 "Been There, Done That" (LP Instrumental) - 5:14

Charts

References

External links

1997 singles
Dr. Dre songs
Songs written by Dr. Dre
Aftermath Entertainment singles
Interscope Records singles
1996 songs
Song recordings produced by Dr. Dre
G-funk songs
Songs written by J-Flexx